The electoral district of Ashwood is an electorate of the Victorian Legislative Assembly in Melbourne, Australia. It was created in the redistribution of electoral boundaries in 2021, and came into effect at the 2022 Victorian state election.

Ashwood covers areas of the abolished districts of Burwood and Mount Waverley with its boundaries being Burke Road to the west, the Monash Freeway to the south, Burwood Highway and Toorak Road to the north, and Blackburn Road to the east. The seat contains the suburbs of Ashburton, Ashwood, Chadstone, Glen Iris, Mount Waverley, and parts of Burwood, Burwood East, and Camberwell.

The abolished seats of Burwood and Mount Waverley were held by Labor MPs Will Fowles and Matt Fregon respectively.

Members for Ashwood

Election results

See also
Parliaments of the Australian states and territories
List of members of the Victorian Legislative Assembly

References

Ashwood, Electoral district of
2022 establishments in Australia
City of Boroondara
City of Whitehorse
City of Monash
Electoral districts and divisions of Greater Melbourne